This is a list of settlements in the island of Lesbos in Greece:

 Afalonas
 Agia Marina
 Agia Paraskevi
 Agiasos
 Agra
 Akrasi
 Alyfanta
 Ampeliko
 Anemotia
 Antissa
 Argennos
 Arisvi
 Asomatos
 Chidira
 Dafia
 Eresos
 Filia
 Ippeio
 Kalloni
 Kapi
 Kato Tritos
 Kerameia
 Kerami
 Kleio
 Komi
 Lafionas
 Lampou Myloi
 Lepetymnos
 Lisvori
 Loutra
 Loutropoli Thermis
 Mantamados
 Megalochori
 Mesagros
 Mesotopos
 Mistegna
 Mithymna
 Moria
 Mychos
 Mytilene
 Napi
 Nees Kydonies
 Neochori
 Palaiochori
 Palaiokipos
 Pamfila
 Panagiouda
 Pappados
 Parakoila
 Pelopi
 Perama
 Petra
 Pigi, Lesbos
 Plagia
 Plakados
 Plomari
 Polichnitos
 Pterounta
 Pyrgoi Thermis
 Sigri
 Skalochori
 Skopelos
 Skoutaros
 Stavros
 Stypsi
 Sykaminia
 Sykounta
 Taxiarches
 Trygonas
 Vasilika
 Vatoussa
 Vrisa
 Ypsilometopo

See also

List of towns and villages in Greece

Lesbos